École secondaire catholique Sainte-Famille (ESC Sainte-Famile or Sainte-Famile), known in English as Holy Family Catholic Secondary School is a French medium Catholic high school located in Mississauga, Ontario, Canada managed by the Conseil scolaire Catholique MonAvenir. Before 1998, the school was part of the Dufferin-Peel Separate School Board (Conseil des écoles séparées catholiques de Dufferin & Peel) as the board's sole French secondary school.

The school offers the International Baccalaureate.

References

French-language high schools in Ontario
Catholic secondary schools in Ontario
Educational institutions in Canada with year of establishment missing